Bolander is a surname. Notable people with the surname include:

Henry Nicholas Bolander (1831–1897), German-American botanist and educator
Nils Bolander (1902–1959), Swedish hymn writer, theologian, and bishop

Fictional characters:
Stanley Bolander
 Steve Bolander, Ron Howard's character in American Graffiti

See also
21852 Bolander, asteroid
Bolender
Bolander's phacelia
Bolander's lily
Bolander's bluegrass

Swedish-language surnames